Tarumovsky District is an administrative and municipal district (raion), one of the forty-one in the Republic of Dagestan, Russia. It is located in the north of the republic. Its administrative center is the rural locality (a selo) of Tarumovka. As of the 2010 Census, the total population of the district was 31,683, with the population of Tarumovka accounting for 17.0% of that number.

Administrative and municipal status
Within the framework of administrative divisions, Tarumovsky District is one of the forty-one in the Republic of Dagestan. The district is divided into five selsoviets which comprise twenty-three rural localities. As a municipal division, the district is incorporated as Tarumovsky Municipal District. Its five selsoviets are incorporated as thirteen rural settlements within the municipal district. The selo of Tarumovka serves as the administrative center of both the administrative and municipal district.

References

Notes

Sources

Districts of Dagestan
 
